Malta competed at the 2004 Summer Olympics in Athens, Greece, from 13 to 29 August 2004. This was the nation's thirteenth appearance at the Olympics since its debut in 1928.

Malta Olympic Committee sent a total of seven athletes, four men and three women, to compete only in athletics, judo, sailing, shooting, and swimming at these Games, matching its delegation count with Atlanta and Sydney. Double trap shooter William Chetcuti became the nation's flag bearer in the opening ceremony. Malta, however, has yet to win its first Olympic medal.

Athletics

Maltese athletes have so far achieved qualifying standards in the following athletics events (up to a maximum of 3 athletes in each event at the 'A' Standard, and 1 at the 'B' Standard).

Men

Women

Key
Note–Ranks given for track events are within the athlete's heat only
Q = Qualified for the next round
q = Qualified for the next round as a fastest loser or, in field events, by position without achieving the qualifying target
NR = National record
N/A = Round not applicable for the event
Bye = Athlete not required to compete in round

Judo

One Maltese judoka qualified for the 2004 Summer Olympics.

Sailing

Maltese sailors have qualified one boat for each of the following events.

Open

M = Medal race; OCS = On course side of the starting line; DSQ = Disqualified; DNF = Did not finish; DNS= Did not start; RDG = Redress given

Shooting 

One Maltese shooter qualified to compete in the following events:

Men

Swimming

Men

Women

See also
 Malta at the 2005 Mediterranean Games

References

External links
Official Report of the XXVIII Olympiad
Malta Olympic Committee

Nations at the 2004 Summer Olympics
2004 Summer Olympics
Summer Olympics